Carmichaelia appressa (common name prostrate broom)  is a species of pea in the family Fabaceae. It is found only in the South Island of New Zealand. Its conservation status (2018) is "At Risk - Naturally Uncommon" under the New Zealand Threat Classification System.

Description
Carmichaelia appressa is a "spreading, closely-branched plant... forming more or less circular mats to 2 m. diameter" which are closely pressed to the ground. It flowers in summer.

Taxonomy
The species was first described by George Simpson in 1945. A lectotype, CHR_45580_A was collected by Simpson in 1938, in February from Ellesmere Spit, Canterbury.

Habitat
Its habitat is "shingle beaches close to the sea".

References

External links
Carmichaelia appressa occurrence data from Australasian Virtual Herbarium

appressa
Flora of New Zealand
Taxa named by George Simpson
Plants described in 1945